The 29th Division was a military formation belonging to the Spanish Republican Army that fought during the Spanish Civil War. Originally created in 1937 from the militarization of the POUM militia column, it was dissolved and recreated again in early 1938, operating on the Extremadura front.

History 
The division was created in April 1937, on the Aragon front, after the militarization of the former militia of the Workers' Party of Marxist Unification (POUM) - the so-called Lenin Division. The unit, which was under the command of Josep Rovira i Canals, was composed of the 128th and 129th mixed brigades, coming from the former POUM columns. In mid-June, in the context of government repression against the POUM, Rovira was detained by the republican authorities. The command of the unit was assumed by the anarchist Miguel García Vivancos. The 29th Division participated in the Huesca Offensive, although it had a mediocre performance. In August, the division ended up being dissolved and reorganized, distributing its former members to other units.

In February 1938, the 29th Division was recreated, under the command of the infantry commander Antonio Rúbert de la Iglesia. The division was integrated into the VII Army Corps, on the Extremadura front. During the month of July, it intervened in the Battle of Merida pocket, of which it would come out bankrupt. As a consequence, it was subjected to a profound reorganization. As of August, it was incorporated into the VI Army Corps.

Command 
 Commanders
 Josep Rovira i Canals (from April 1937);
 Miguel García Vivancos (from July 1937);
 Antonio Rúbert de la Iglesia (from February 1938);
 Antonio de Blas García;
 Fernando Monasterio Bustos (from April 1938);
 José Cirac Laiglesia (from November 1938)

 Commissars
 Joaquín Vila Claramunt, of the PSUC (from February 1938);
 Benigno Alonso de Dios, of the PCE (from August 1938);
 Froilán Nanclares Cocho (from March 1939)

 Chiefs of Staff
 Enrique Trigo Bru (from February 1938);
 Luis Recuenco Gómez (from April 1938);

Order of battle

Notes

References

Bibliography 
 
 
 
 
 
 
 
 

Military units and formations established in 1937
Military units and formations disestablished in 1937
Military units and formations established in 1938
Military units and formations disestablished in 1938
Divisions of Spain
Military units and formations of the Spanish Civil War
Military history of Spain
Armed Forces of the Second Spanish Republic